Leandro Moldes is a Swiss former singer, born 26 May 1986 in Spain to Rita and Manuel. He has a sister, Riwana.

In 2000, Leandro released a CD titled Leandro and a 6-track maxi single titled Girl, under the BMG Berlin label. 
He currently (2014) serves as the managing director of Moldes International Commodity Trading (Moldes ICT) located in Wabern bei Bern. He lives near Berne, Switzerland.

Discography

Solo albums
Leandro (BMG 74321 75097-2, 16-track CD) 2000
 Girl, 4:17
 Close to You, 3:51
 What Will I Become, 3:53
 You Are Like Music, 3:07
 Good Times of Your Life, 3:16
 I Adore Mi Amor, 3:54
 Explain This World to Me, 4:57
 Love Letters, 3:52
 Do What You Like, 3:02
 Smile, 3:15
 Wanna Hold Your Hand, 3:32
 L.O.V.E, 4:20
 If Only You Were Here, 3:40
 Too Shy, 3:13
 Good Day, 3:25
 You Must Not Be Sorry, 4:47

Singles
Girl (BMG 74321 74516-2, 6-track CD Single) 2000
 Girl [Radio/Video], 4:17
 Girl [U.S. Version], 4:57
 Girl [Club-Mix], 6:28
 Girl [House-Mix], 6:02
 Girl [Instrumental], 4:15
 Girl [Just for you], 1:12

Trivia
He is fluent in 7 different languages.

External links
 Leandro at The Boy Choir & Soloist directory
 Leandro at kidsmusic.info

1986 births
Living people
Swiss people of Spanish descent